Crooked Run may refer to:

Crooked Run (Trent River tributary), a stream in Jones County, North Carolina
Crooked Run (Catawissa Creek), in Schuylkill County, Pennsylvania
Crooked Run (Monongahela River), in Allegheny County, Pennsylvania
Crooked Run (Youghiogheny River tributary), a stream in Fayette County, Pennsylvania